Mohammad Salemy (born 1967 in Iran, Kermanshah)
 
is a Canadian artist, art critic, curator, writer 
. curator, writer He is sometimes referred to as "Mo Salemy".

Biography 
 Salemy holds a master's degree in Critical Curatorial Studies from the University of British Columbia.
 His work is situated in the space between curatorial and artistic practice.

Artist 

As an artist he has shown his work internationally and nationally, specially in Ashkal Alwan in Beirut and Witte de With in Rotterdam. In 2016 he participated in the Gwangju Biennale with his project "For Machine Use Only".

Curator 
Salemy has curated shows at the Morris and Helen Belkin Art Gallery, Koerner Gallery, AMS Gallery at the University of British Columbia, Access Gallery, as well as the Satellite Gallery and he was the curator of Dadabase. Lastly his curatorial project "For Machine Use Only" was included in the 11th edition of the Gwangju Biennale. His curatorial project "This is the Sea" was included in the 2017 edition of the artmonte-carlo 
 Together with Patrick Schabus he curated the 2018 edition of the Sofia Queer Forum, that featured Barbara Hammer and Bruce laBruce.

Teaching 

He is one of the co-founders of The New Centre for Research & Practice and the Fixing the Future platform.
 In 2014, he organized the Incredible Machines conference in Vancouver.
 and the "Here and Elsewhere, at War, and into the Future: Palestine" Discussion that was hosted Live at Whitebox Art Center. In 2015 he co-organized the "Knowledge Forms and Forming Knowledge – Limits and Horizons of Transdisciplinary Art-Based Research" Seminar at the University of Graz and the IZK Künstlerhaus – Halle für Kunst & Medien. He gave lectures and presentations at the New Museum, Art in General, the Dutch Art Institute, UNSW University of New South Wales, Witte de With Contemporary Art,
 Goethe-Institut, CalArts School of Critical Studies, NYU, CA2M and the University of British Columbia.

Publications 
As a writer, critic, and editor, Salemy has been a regular contributor to numerous exhibition catalogues, anthologies, and journals. 
His writings have appeared in numerous journals, catalogues, books, and magazines including: e-flux, Volume, Flash Art, Brooklyn Rail
, Third Rail,Ocula, Spike Art Quarterly  DIS Magazine, C Magazine

In 2016 he edited the book For Machine Use Only (&&& / The New Centre, 2016.) that featured texts by Jason Adams / Kate Armstrong, Elie Ayache, Benjamin Bratton, Clint Burnham, Lou Cantor, Manuel Correa, Alexander Galloway, Leo Goldsmith, Simón Isaza, Victoria Ivanova, Vaclav Janoscik, Ed Keller, Diana Khamis, Jessica Law, Siwin Lo, Nicola Masciandaro, Gean Moreno, Benjamin Noys, Jeff O’brien, Matteo Pasquinelli, David Roden, Judith Rodenbeck, Rory Rowan, Daniel Sacilotto, Samuel Sackeroff, T’ai Smith, Nick Srnicek, Kate Steinmann, Steven Warrick, and Peter Wolfendale.

His texts were published in books like "reinventing horizons",
 and Politics of study. He participated in numerous panel discussions and lectures in galleries, museums and colleges.

Works (selection) 

ART AFTER THE MACHINES, 2015 

The Artist Is Hyperpresent, Installation 2015 

What were you doing on 9/11?, 2010-2015 

Stairwell, 2015 

Preliminary materials for any theory, 2014 

THIS IS NEW YORK GARBAGE, Color prints, 2009 

In between the empty frames, Color prints, 2008 

How to Assemble an Atomic Bomb, DVD and tin can, 2006.

Exhumed: Deliberating R.M. Khomeini, Photographs, 2002

Other endeavors 
He was the co-founder of the successful fashion label "Government Clothing", and is known for his activism
He also worked as a designer, specially for The Organ (band)'s album Grab that gun

Bibliography 
 "The Sacred Meme Magic",
 "For Machine Use Only", &&& / The New Centre, 2016.
 
 Manuel Correa, "artoffline" produced by Indiepix Films,2018.
 Dorothée Dupuis (ed.), "Mohammad Salemy and the New Centre for Research and Practice" in "Terremoto 4. " 2015.
 
 Salemy, Mohammad. "Tom McGlynn and the Asymtotes of Opticality", catalogue essay, For Geochromatic Index on Dadabase.Com NYC, 2014
 
 "Time and Televisual Intersubjectivity, McLuhan's Idea of Globalized Presence as the Prehistory of Telecomputation" in "This is Paradise: Art and Artists in Toronto", Published on 28 May 2015, pages 12–13

References

External links
 A city is a stateless mind
 SYSTEMS OF A GREATER SUM, Bots Bodies Beasts
 Mohammad Salemy on anthropocinema, e-flux
 "Accelerating Beyond "Iran"? "An Interview with Mohammad Salemy on Telecomputation, Digital Production, and Diaspora by Ajam Media Collective"
e-flux 
Interview with Mohammad Salemy on Shaw TV
Interview with Mohammad Salemy on Studio 4 with Fanny Kiefer, 2011
ARTISTS IN CONVERSATION – Mohammad Salemy at the  Witte de With Center for Contemporary Art
Lisa Ruyter
"AFTER POST INTERNET & THE WINTER OF AI"
"Mohammad Salemy on the New Centre for Research & Practice by Rosemary Heather"
"America Is Hard to See: A Guide to not being depressed about US electoral politics this November"
"Exploring Turkey's Political Crises Through Symbols of Byzantine Supremacy"
"From Canada to Kanye: A Portrait of Yeezy as an Artist"
"Artificial Intelligence and the Cybernetic Revolution: Video program by Mohammad Salemy"
"Glopartheid"

 Fardid in His Own Words, An Interview with Ahmad Fardid by Alireza Meibodi, Introduction and Translation by Mohammad Salemy (in English)
 "THOMAS BAYRLE AT MAK VIENNA"

1967 births
21st-century Canadian artists
Art curators
Mass media theorists
Iranian photographers
Iranian contemporary artists
Iranian emigrants to Canada
Canadian activists
Canadian non-fiction writers
Canadian installation artists
Living people